Lammot du Pont I (April 13, 1831 – March 29, 1884) was a chemist and a key member of the du Pont family and its company in the mid-19th century.

Early life
Du Pont was born in 1831 in New Castle County, Delaware, the son of Margaretta Elizabeth (Lammot) and Alfred V. du Pont, and grandson of French-born Éleuthère Irénée du Pont de Nemours, the founder of E. I. du Pont de Nemours and Company. Lammot was born at Nemours, the family home built in 1824 and named in honor of the full family name.

Lammot studied chemistry at the University of Pennsylvania, and obtained a bachelor of arts degree in 1849.

Career 
He entered into the family business, and used his chemistry knowledge to patent B blasting powder in 1857. His invention used an inexpensive Peruvian and Chilean sodium nitrate, which he had discovered in 1858 could be used to manufacture black powder more cheaply than potassium nitrate.

In the Civil War, du Pont enlisted in 1862 and was commissioned captain of Company B, 5th Delaware Volunteer Infantry that served at Fort Delaware on Pea Patch Island.

He was elected as a member of the American Philosophical Society in 1872.

In 1880, du Pont convinced his family that a new explosive, dynamite, would eventually make gunpowder obsolete. His vision eventually made the company a major force in the blasting powder industry. Later, he founded the Repauno Chemical Company and helped his family's company enter the high explosives business.

Personal life 

Lammot du Pont married Mary Belin (1839–1913) and had 11 children:

Isabella d'Andelot du Pont (1866–1871)
Louisa d'Andelot du Pont (1868–1926), married Charles Copeland (1867–1944), one son:
Lammot du Pont Copeland (1905–1983)
Pierre S. du Pont (1870–1954), married Alice Belin, no children
Sophie Madeleine du Pont (1871–1894)
Henry Belin du Pont (1873–1902), married Eleuthera du Pont Bradford, one son:
Henry Belin du Pont, Jr. (1898-1970)
William Kemble du Pont (1874–1907), married twice; four children
Irénée du Pont (1876–1963) married Irene Sophie du Pont, had 10 children:
Mary Alletta Belin du Pont (1878–1938), married William Winder Laird, one son
Lammot du Pont II (1880–1952)
Isabella Mathieu du Pont (1882–1946), married Hugh Rodney Sharp (1880–1968), two children
Margaretta Lammot du Pont (1884-1973), married Robert Ruliph Morgan Carpenter
Louisa d'Andelot Carpenter (1907-1976)
Robert Ruliph Morgan Carpenter, Jr. (1915-1990)
He died in a nitroglycerin explosion on March 29, 1884, in Gibbstown, New Jersey.

Legacy
The Lammot du Pont Laboratory at the University of Delaware is named in his honor. The -building houses laboratories of the Department of Chemistry and Biochemistry and the College of Marine Studies.

Further reading

References

1831 births
1884 deaths
People of Delaware in the American Civil War
Lammot I du Pont
Lammot I du Pont
University of Pennsylvania alumni
Accidental deaths in New Jersey
Scientists from Delaware
People from New Castle, Delaware
19th-century American scientists
Union Army officers